Md Rahbar Wahed Khan, also known as Sharan Khan (born 6 March 1996), is a Bangladeshi professional footballer who plays as a midfielder for the Bangladesh national team.

Early life
Khan attended school at Bangladesh International Tutorial, where he was named captain of the U14 football team. He began playing underground football at the age of eleven and played for teams such as DOHS United and Seven Nations Army.

College career
In 2014, Khan began attending Siena Heights University, playing for the soccer team, on a 25% scholarship. He scored his first goal in his second season, against Grace Christian University on 15 September 2015. He became the captain of the team, was named the Player of the Year award in 2016 and 2017. In his senior season, he scored a career-high seven goals, including a hat trick against the Cornerstone Golden Eagles on 14 October 2017. In 2017, he earned All-WHAC honours, was the WHAC men's soccer offensive player of the week twice, earned WHAC All-Academic honours (which he also earned in 2016) and was named an NAIA Scholar-Athlete. The university also offered him a job as an assistant coach.

Club career
Khan was contacted by two clubs in the Bangladesh Premier League, but he turned them down as his dream was to play in Europe.

In 2021, he played with the North Toronto Nitros in the Canadian League1 Ontario. He made his debut on 31 July, against Master's FA.

On 30 October 2021, he signed for Bangladesh Premier League club Sheikh Jamal DC. He made his official debut on 27 November in an Independence Cup match against the Bangladesh Air Force, recording an assist in a 3-0 victory. After suffering lateral meniscus and ACL injuries earlier in the season, he requested and was granted his release from the club in April 2022, choosing to return to Canada to rehab the injury that would keep him out for the season.

International career
In August 2021, Khan was called up to the Bangladesh national team for the 2021 Three Nations Cup in Kyrgyzstan. His father said Rhabar resigned from his job in Canada, in order to accept the call-up. On 5 September, he made his debut, against Palestine. He made his first start two days later against Kyrgyzstan.

Career statistics

External links

References

1996 births
Living people
Footballers from Dhaka
Bangladeshi footballers
Association football midfielders
Bangladesh international footballers
Siena Heights University alumni
North Toronto Nitros players
League1 Ontario players
Bangladeshi expatriate footballers
Sheikh Jamal Dhanmondi Club players